Eastham Rake railway station is a railway station which serves the village of Eastham in Merseyside, England.

Facilities
The station is staffed, during all opening hours, and has platform CCTV. There is a payphone, a vending machine and a booking office. There are departure and arrival screens, on the platform, for passenger information. Each of the two platforms has sheltered seating. There is a free car park with 101 spaces, a cycle rack with 6 spaces, and a secure cycle locker with 44 spaces. Access to the station booking office is on the pavement. Access to each of the two platforms is by a stepped ramp. This allows relatively easy access for passengers with wheelchairs or prams.

Services
Trains operate every 15 minutes between Chester and Liverpool on weekdays and Saturdays until late evening when the service becomes half-hourly, as it is on Sundays. Additionally there is a half-hourly service between Liverpool and Ellesmere Port all day, every day. Northbound trains operate via Hamilton Square station in Birkenhead and the Mersey Railway Tunnel to Liverpool. Southbound the next station is Hooton, where the lines to Chester and Ellesmere Port divide. These services are all provided by Merseyrail's fleet of Class 507 and Class 508 EMUs.

Gallery

References

Further reading

External links 

Railway stations in the Metropolitan Borough of Wirral
DfT Category E stations
Railway stations opened by Railtrack
Railway stations in Great Britain opened in 1995
Railway stations served by Merseyrail